Victor Corrêa (born March 14, 1990 in Alfenas) is a Brazilian racing driver currently competing in the European F3 Open Championship.

Career
The young Victor Corrêa began his career in karting in 1999 in Alfenas at 9 years old competing in the regional championships. He soon won the South-Mineiro Champion in the Cadet category. Later he became the Mineiro Champion in Junior Minor category and Mineiro championship in Junior category, along with excellent results in the competitive Paulista Championship and also in the Brazilian Championship.

In 2006 he debuted in Formula São Paulo. In the following year he won the category title with a round to spare.

In 2008 he came in fourth place in the British Formula Ford Championship.

In 2009 he joined the Litespeed team in the British Formula Three National Class, finishing in 3rd place.

In 2010 he competed in the first half of the British Formula Renault Championship with CRS Racing team but his performance was poor.

During the second half of 2010 he competed in the European F3 Open with Team West-Tec and took two wins at Monza.He had one win overall in his Copa car.

Racing record

Career summary

References

External links

Brazilian racing drivers
1990 births
Living people
Euroformula Open Championship drivers
Sportspeople from Minas Gerais
CRS Racing drivers
Team West-Tec drivers
British Formula Renault 2.0 drivers
British Formula Three Championship drivers